Gaoqiao station may refer to:
 Gaoqiao station (Ningbo Rail Transit) in Ningbo, Zhejiang, China
 Gaoqiao station (Shanghai Metro), in Shanghai, China
Gaoqiao station (Hangzhou Metro), in Hangzhou, Zhejiang, China

See also 
 Gaoqiao West station, another station in Ningbo
 West Gaoqiao station, another station in Shanghai